Right This Minute (alternatively abbreviated as RTM) was an American syndicated television program that debuted on September 12, 2011. Produced by MagicDust Television in conjunction with television station groups Cox Media Group, Gray Television and the E. W. Scripps Company, it is a daily half-hour program that features both serious and offbeat viral videos plus interviews and stories behind the videos presented by a team of hosts. The show ended its 11-year run on April 29, 2022 with reruns ("remixes" as some of the hosts of the show have described them as) continuing to be broadcast in syndication until September 2, 2022 after not being renewed for another season.

Overview
The program showcases a broad mix of viral videos trending online,  interviews with content creators as well as caught-on-tape footage of stories in the news; the videos and interviews are introduced by five hosts – Charity Bailey, Gayle Bass, Nick Calderone, Oli Pettigrew and Christian Vera. Steven Fabian left the show to work for the syndicated newsmagazine Inside Edition. On July 27, 2015, Beth Troutman left the show for WCNC-TV in Charlotte, North Carolina, to anchor its weeknight 6 and 11pm newscasts.

Videos typically shown on Right This Minute include dashcam and security camera footage of criminal acts and police pursuits; freak accidents; people and animals displaying interesting talents; rescue footage; epic fails (such as extreme sports mishaps, and other various stunts that go wrong); humorous or dangerous stunts; practical jokes; parodies; and original user-created content culled from various user-submitted video websites (such as YouTube, LiveLeak, Break.com and eBaum's World) and sent directly to the program's website and mobile app. The program also features one or more interviews with those involved in a particular video in each episode.  Some episodes include staff member Jessica Hord doing a craft project or preparing a recipe after which the finished food is tasted by some of the hosts.

In a break from the usual format, after airing an Instagram video of magician John Stessel, he appeared live on the Right This Minute set and performed magic for the hosts.

Episodes initially were one hour long, but as a result of a revamp of the series' format in 2012, it began producing two half-hour episodes daily, as well as two half-hour "best of" editions on weekends featuring segments shown during the weekday broadcasts. Some stations carrying the program choose to air both daily half-hour episodes as a one-hour block, while others choose to air only one of the episodes or split them into different time slots.

Production and distribution
Right This Minute is syndicated to stations across the country. Originally, it aired only on stations owned by originating partners Cox Media Group, Raycom Media (itself acquired by Gray Television at the start of 2019; the on-air credit has since been changed to Gray Media Group) and the E. W. Scripps Company. In 2013, MagicDust Television and the Raycom-Scripps-Cox consortium partnered with MGM Television to distribute the program to stations owned by other broadcasting companies. In April 2014, Fox Television Stations picked up RTM for broadcast on Fox's owned-and-operated stations in ten markets. Through additional station distribution deals, the show's national clearances grew to approximately 91% of U.S. television markets as a Monday through Friday strip. Rebroadcasts of the show aired on cable channel HLN from February to September 2014.

During its first season, Right This Minute was produced at the Walter Cronkite School of Journalism and Mass Communication at Arizona State University. The program moved its production and operations to its current home in the Ahwatukee neighborhood of Phoenix. As of March 2020, the series is now indefinitely hosted from the homes of its hosts via videotelephony due to the COVID-19 pandemic, with off-air production and direction also being done remotely.

On January 19, 2016, it was announced that Disney–ABC Home Entertainment and Television Distribution would take over distribution of Right This Minute for the 2016–17 television season. As result of the change of distributor, the eight ABC O&O stations picked up the program starting in fall 2016, replacing the one-season FABLife. Hamilton, Ontario's CHCH picked up the program for airing throughout Canada from September 12, 2016 to September 7, 2018.

According to Nick Calderon on the show's Facebook page, the show was not renewed for another season in 2022, therefore ending its 11-year run on television. Since May, only reruns or "remixes" (shows with old video content mixed in) would air on commercial TV stations until the final rerun air on September 2, 2022 before going off the air for good.

References

External links
Official website

2010s American television talk shows
2020s American television talk shows
2011 American television series debuts
2010s American television news shows
2020s American television news shows
2022 American television series endings
First-run syndicated television programs in the United States
English-language television shows
2010s American video clip television series
2020s American video clip television series
Television series by Sony Pictures Television
Television series by MGM Television
Television series by Disney–ABC Domestic Television
Mass media about Internet culture
Television series about social media
Internet memes